Jamides festivus is a butterfly in the family Lycaenidae.

References

Jamides
Butterflies described in 1886